Ustad Bahadur Khan (born Bahadur Hossain Khan; 19 January 1931 – 3 October 1989) was an Indian sarod player and film score composer.

Early life and family
Ustad Bahadur Khan, a Bengali, was born on 19 January 1931 in Shibpur, Brahmanbaria, Bangladesh (then British India). From a musical family, he was the son of the Indian classical musician Ayet Ali Khan and related to sitar player Pandit Ravi Shankar. Khan first learnt to play the sarode from his father  and his uncle Alauddin Khan in Maihar, before he finally settled in Calcutta. He also practiced vocal music and later collaborated with his cousins Ali Akbar Khan and Shrimati Annapurna Devi.

Khan's brothers Abed Hossain Khan and Mobarak Hossain Khan were also musicians and based in Bangladesh, and were the recipients from the Government of Bangladesh for their contributions to classical music. Bahadur Khan is the father of sitar player Kirit Khan, who died in 2006. One of his better-known students is the sarod player Tejendra Narayan Majumdar.

He died on 3 October 1989 in Calcutta, India. His eldest son Bidyut Khan continues to perform the sarod around the world.

Filmography
Khan was a regular performer at the All India Radio, Radio Pakistan and Radio Bangladesh. He composed and directed music for many films by the legendary Indian filmmaker Ritwik Ghatak and featured in the following:

Subarnarekha (The Golden Line).
Meghe Dhaka Tara (The Cloud-clapped Star)
Komal Gandhar (E Flat)
Jukti Takko Aar Gappo (Reason, Debate and A Story)
Titash Ekti Nadir Naam (A River Named Titash)
Nagarik (The Citizen)
Shwet Mayur (White Peacock)
Yekhane Dariye (Where I Am Standing)
Trisandhyay (Three Twilights)
Notun Pata (New Leaf)
Garm Hava (Hot Winds, 1973)

Teaching
Khan was a reputed teacher, and a faculty member for six months at the Ali Akbar College of Music in California, USA, where he taught Indian classical music. His students include his son Bidyut Khan, nephew Shahadat Hossain Khan, Tejendranarayan Majumdar, Kalyan Mukherjee, Monoj Shankar and his nephew Khurshid Khan.

Every year, a one-day music festival takes place commemorating the death anniversary of the Khan in Calcutta, organized by the "Ustad Bahadur Khan Music Circle". In Bangladesh, his legacy is continued through the "Ustad Ayet Ali Khan Sangeet Niketon" (Ustad Ayet Ali Khan Memorial School of Music) - a music school in memory of  his father Ayet Ali Khan - at their native village Shibpur.

References

External links
 
 Bidyut Khan's blog
 Kalyan Mukherjee's Homepage
 Shahdat Hossain Khan's review
 Review of the film Subarnarekha
 Home Page of Ali Akbar College of Music

1931 births
1989 deaths
Bengali musicians
Hindustani instrumentalists
Sarod players
20th-century Indian Muslims
People from Satna
Maihar gharana
Indian film score composers
Indian male classical musicians
Indian music educators
Hindustani composers
20th-century Indian composers
20th-century Indian male singers
20th-century Indian singers
Indian male film score composers
Indian classical musicians of Bengal
Musicians from West Bengal